Feng Fei may refer to:
 Feng Fei (politician) (born 1962), Chinese politician
 Feng Fei (baseball) (born 1983), Chinese baseball player

See also
Consort Feng (disambiguation)